Blue Ball Village is an unincorporated community in Cecil County, Maryland, United States.

Andrew Job, a Quaker settler, operated the Blue Ball Inn starting in 1710 at a crossroads in the area. The former village of Blue Ball is no more, but Blue Ball Road retains the name.

References

Unincorporated communities in Maryland
Unincorporated communities in Cecil County, Maryland